Astroloma pinifolium, commonly known as pine heath, is small prostrate shrub or groundcover in the family Ericaceae endemic to eastern Australia.

Taxonomy
It was initially described by the botanist Robert Brown in his 1810 work Prodromus Florae Novae Hollandiae as Stenanthera pinifolia, before being assigned to the genus Astroloma by George Bentham in his work Flora Australiensis in 1868. The specific name is derived from the Latin words pinus "pine" and folium "leaf".

Description
Astroloma pinifolium grows as a spreading shrub 30 cm to 1 m (12–40 in) high and 0.5 to 1.5 m (20 in to 5 ft) across. Its hairy stems are densely packed with pine-like leaves 1–3 cm (0.4-1.2 in) long. The tubular flowers are up to 2 cm (0.8 in) long and appear from August to April, and are found singly along the stems, either yellow or pink with a band of yellow, green at the tip, and tapered at both ends. Flowers are followed by pale green globular berries around 0.5 cm (0.2 in) in diameter.

Distribution and habitat
Pine heath is found from the north coast of New South Wales, from Evans Head south along the coast, Southern Tablelands and great divide into Victoria and Tasmania. It grows in open forest and heathland on well-drained sandy soils, where it co-occurs with 
such species as Eucalyptus sieberi, E. globoidea, and Angophora costata in the former habitat, and Allocasuarina distyla and Banksia ericifolia in the latter.

Ecology
The Tasmanian subspecies of the grey currawong (known locally as clinking currawong or black jay) appears especially fond of the berries. One observer noting how sluggish and quiet the normally noisy birds were, wondered whether there was some narcotic effect the plant imparted on the birds.

Cultivation
Astroloma pinifolium can be grown in well-drained soils or in containers in part shade, and propagated from cuttings.

References

pinifolium
Ericales of Australia
Flora of New South Wales
Flora of Tasmania
Flora of Victoria (Australia)